Frank J. Chaloupka (born c. 1962) is an American professor of economics at the University of Illinois at Chicago (UIC) and an affiliate of the National Bureau of Economic Research. He is an expert in the economic analysis of substance use disorders and on the effect of prices and substance control policies in affecting the demands for tobacco, alcohol, and illicit drugs. Chaloupka has authored over a hundred articles and several book chapters on topics within this area. He also works as a researcher on a Cancer Prevention And Control program.

Chaloupka received his B.A. in economics from John Carroll University in Ohio in May 1984, and his Ph.D. from the City University of New York in May 1988, specializing in health economics, industrial organization, labor economics, and applied econometrics. Chaloupka directs Impacteen, a collaboration funded by the Robert Wood Johnson Foundation which investigates common threats to adolescent health, such as obesity, substance use disorders, and tobacco use. Impacteen is based at the UIC Institute for Health Research and Policy, and collaborators are at RAND, Roswell Park Comprehensive Cancer Center, and other institutions around the country.

In 2009, Chaloupka was named UIC Researcher of the Year. He is the "first winner of the UIC Researcher of the Year award for social science and humanities."

Chaloupka has a wife Eshell, and three children; Benjamin, Jacob, and Frank.

Selected publications
 Gallus S, Lugo A, La Vecchia C, Boffetta P, Chaloupka FJ, Colombo P, Currie L, Fernandez E, Fischbacher C, Gilmore A, Godfrey F, Joossens L, Leon ME, Levy DT, Nguyen L, Rosenqvist G, Ross H, Townsend J, Clancy L. Pricing Policies And Control of Tobacco in Europe (PPACTE) project: cross-national comparison of smoking prevalence in 18 European countries. Eur J Cancer Prev. 2014 Jan 15.
 Terry-McElrath YM, Turner L, Sandoval A, Johnston LD, Chaloupka FJ. Commercialism in U.S. elementary and secondary school nutrition environments: trends from 2007 to 2012. Jama Pediatr. 2014 Jan 13
 Tauras JA, Chaloupka FJ, Keith JD, Brown DP, Meyer JB. Economic Impact of a Noncomprehensive Smoke-Free Air Law. Health Promot Pract. 2014 Jan 6.
 Chaloupka FJ, Tauras JA, Strasser JH, Willis G, Gibson JT, Hartman AM. A comparison of alternative methods for measuring cigarette prices. Tob Control. 2013 Dec 23.
 Chaloupka FJ, Kostova D, Shang C; on behalf of the GATS Collaborative Group. Cigarette excise tax structure and cigarette prices: evidence from the Global Adult Tobacco Survey and the U.S. National Adult Tobacco Survey. Nicotine Tob. Res. 2013 Aug.

References

External links
 University of Illinois at Chicago homepage of Frank Chaloupka
 Impacteen Official website

1960s births
Living people
Health economists
21st-century American economists
University of Illinois Chicago faculty
Substance-related disorders
John Carroll University alumni
City University of New York alumni